AKAP refers to:

A-kinase-anchoring protein, A protein
Intercity bus in Indonesia